The Dawson Bank Museum is a bank operating inside of the former First National Bank Building in Dawson, Minnesota. The building is listed on the National Register of Historic Places.

Renovation of the museum 
Renovation of the First National Bank Building began in the late 2010s, and was finished in 2018. The museum has received some funding from community donations page.  The City of Dawson contributed = 0.  Dennis & Ruby Anderson donated $100,000, Mason Lodge %$5750, Farmers for $5000 Dawson

Artifacts of interest 
The Dawson Bank Museum holds many artifacts of interest including;

 A 1930s projector from the Grand Theater, a building located across the street from the museum
 The projector was used from the 1930s–1960s
 Roger Perkins, a projector operator in the area, wrote a story about the projector.
 Calendars dating back to the 1930s
 1942 Dawson Football Champions Trophy
 The trophy's inscription reads; 1942 Football Champions / Season's scores / Dawson 63 Opponents 0 
 Loaned by the family of Robin Winge
 Ethel Mahlam Doll Collection
 Donated by Ruby Anderson

Rooms 

 Veterans' Room
 Dedicated to World War I, World War II, and Korean War veterans
 Contains model airplanes
 Second floor of museum
 Steve's Safari Room
 The museum was renovated to house the artifacts located in this room.
 Contains artifacts from Steve's trips to Africa
Dennis &Ruby Anderson donated $100,000 & 1000's hours of labor in memory of Steve for the renovation

First National Bank Building

Overview 
The First National Bank Building is a two-story building made of brownstone and polished granite.  It is built in the Richardsonian Romanesque Style.  It is built on a coursed ashlar foundation.

Significance 
The First National Bank Building is significant because of its well-preserved exterior in the Richardson Romanesque Style.  It also is associated with Christopher M. Anderson, a pioneer and incorporator of Dawson."The construction of the imposing, and architecturally distinctive, Commercial Bank building (later First National Bank) attested to the turn of the century prosperity of Dawson, and to the commitment of Anderson to its stability and future promise."

1930 bank robbery 
In April 1930, two people robbed the First National Bank.  They cashed a $20 bill, and looked around the building before their heist.  The next day, they came back to the bank with guns, and robbed the bank.  At the time of the robbery, there was a total of eight people in the bank.  The robbers made the eight people lay on the floor, and after they took what they wanted from the bank, herded the eight people into the bank's vault, locked the vault's door, and fled.  The robbers never returned.

Inside the vault it was lightless and airtight.  The eight people inside started rapidly running out of air to breathe.  Eventually, a customer came into the bank and heard the screams for help from the trapped people.  The bank president gave the customer the vault's combination, but the customer had never opened a bank vault before and didn't know how to do it.  So, the customer got the president from another bank in town, and they opened the vault, setting the eight people free.

After the incident, a vent was installed in the vault.

The crime was unsolved until the mid-2010s, when a niece was rummaging through her recently passed away uncle's belongings.  The niece found a book titled, "How I Made my Living, I Rob Banks".  The uncle didn't write the book, but he was in possession of it.  Inside the book was sketches of various banks including Dawson's First National Bank.

The robbery was reenacted in the summer of 2019.

Uses of second story 
It is rumored that the building has held Ku Klux Klan meetings in its second story.

The second story:
Now displays war artifacts.  Showa the dress uniform of the 3-war veteran Col.Wayne Moe. Cold weather flight suit of Harris Ronning when he was a B-24 belly gunner

In media 
The Dawson Bank Museum was featured on the 11th season and 12th episode of Postcards, a television series by PBS.

References 

Bank buildings
Richardsonian Romanesque architecture
Historic buildings and structures
History museums in Minnesota
Lac qui Parle County, Minnesota